Edward Hatton, also known as E. G. Hatton, was a footballer who played centre forward for Reading F.C. and Thames Ironworks, the team that eventually became West Ham United. He joined Thames Ironworks in 1896, scoring a brace on his debut in a 3–1 win in a London League fixture against Vampires F.C.

During his two seasons at the club he played in six London League games, scoring four goals and in four FA Cup games, scoring one goal. He also made an appearance in the London Senior Cup, making a total of eleven senior appearances for the club and is known to have made appearances in at least two friendlies.

See also
 1896–97 Thames Ironworks F.C. season
 1897–98 Thames Ironworks F.C. season

Notes
 In erroneous sources this players' name is also given as E. G. Hutton.

References

Year of birth missing
Year of death missing
English footballers
Reading F.C. players
Thames Ironworks F.C. players
Association football forwards